Zbuczyn  is a village in Siedlce County, Masovian Voivodeship, in east-central Poland. It is the seat of the gmina (administrative district) called Gmina Zbuczyn.

The village has a population of 1,836.

The history of Zbuczyn dates back to the 14th century, which makes it one of the oldest towns of Lublin Voivodeship’s Lukow Land (province of Lesser Poland). In 1418, King Wladyslaw Jagiello established here a Roman Catholic parish, also granting Magdeburg rights to the village. Zbuczyn remained a town for some 350 years, as on October 11, 1750, King Augustus III officially turned it back to the status of a village. 

Until the Partitions of Poland, Zbuczyn belonged to the historic province of Lesser Poland. In 1815, it became part of Russian-controlled Congress Poland, in which it remained until World War I.

References

Zbuczyn
Lesser Poland
Lublin Voivodeship (1474–1795)
Siedlce Governorate
Lublin Governorate
Lublin Voivodeship (1919–1939)